Jinhua Subdistrict is a subdistrict in Liwan District, Guangzhou, People's Republic of China.

Schools 
Local Schools:
  Ludixi Primary School
  Guangzhou Nanhai Middle School
  Guangzhou Liwan District Fourth Middle Juxian Middle School
  Guangzhou Fourth Middle School

Roads 
 Xihua road
 Guangfu road
 Ludi Street
 Hean Street
 Doulao Qian
 Jinhua Zhijie
 Zhongshan 7 Road
 Kangwang North Road
 Kangwang Middle Road

Transport 
Guangzhou Metro Line 1 Chen Clan Academy station

Hospital 
 Guangzhou Medical University Liwan Hospital

References

Liwan District
Township-level divisions of Guangdong
Subdistricts of the People's Republic of China